The men's marathon event was part of the track and field athletics programme at the 1920 Summer Olympics. The distance of this race was 42.75 kilometres. The competition was held on Sunday, 22 August 1920. 48 runners from 17 nations competed. No nation had more than 4 runners, suggesting the limit had been reduced from the 12 maximum in force in 1908 and 1912. The event was won by Hannes Kolehmainen of Finland, the nation's first Olympic marathon medal and victory; Kolehmainen received his fourth gold medal, having won the 5000 metres, 10,000 metres, and individual cross country in 1912. Estonia (Jüri Lossmann's silver) and Italy (Valerio Arri's bronze) also won their first marathon medals.

Background

This was the sixth appearance of the event, which is one of 12 athletics events to have been held at every Summer Olympics. The field included significant competitors, including the original Flying Finn, Hannes Kolehmainen (who had not run the marathon in 1912, but took gold in three other distance events) and his brother Tatu Kolehmainen (who had competed in the 1912 marathon); South Africa's Christian Gitsham (silver medal in the 1912 marathon); and American Boston Marathon winners Arthur Roth (1916) and Carl Linder (1919), as well as future winner Charles Mellor (1925). Shizo Kanakuri of Japan, still considered a missing person in Sweden after disappearing during the 1912 Olympic marathon, competed.

Chile, Estonia, and India each made their first appearance in Olympic marathons. The United States made its sixth appearance, the only nation to have competed in each Olympic marathon to that point.

Competition format

As all marathons, the competition was a single race. The course for the race was listed as 42.75 kilometres long, making it the longest Olympic marathon ever. However, the Association of Road Racing Statisticians estimated the course to be only 40 km, which would make it among the shorter courses in the pre-standardized era. The course included 1.5 laps of the stadium at both the start and finish.

Records

These were the standing world and Olympic records (in hours) prior to the 1920 Summer Olympics.

(*) Distance was 40.2 kilometres

Hannes Kolehmainen is recognized as having set a new world best with a time of 2:32:35.8 hours.

Schedule

The weather during the race has been described as "cool". An Associated Press report described the weather as "cold and showery", but "fine running weather for the marathoners".

Results

References
Specific

General
 
 

Marathon
Marathons at the Olympics
Men's marathons